Chahar Bisheh-ye Sofla (also Romanized as Chahār Bīsheh-ye Soflá; also known as Chahār Bīsheh) is a village in Lishtar Rural District, in the Central District of Gachsaran County, Kohgiluyeh and Boyer-Ahmad Province, Iran. At the 2006 census, its population was 326, in 64 families.

References 

Populated places in Gachsaran County